Ian Robert Beven (born 27 November 1958 in Hobart) is a former first class cricketer. He was brought up in Tasmania, whom he represented in the Sheffield Shield between 1980/81 and 1983/84.

In 1983 he moved to Scotland and played club cricket. He became a permanent citizen and took a wicket with his first ball for Scotland, trapping Test player Roland Butcher LBW. He went on to appear 27 times for Scotland and he helped them reach the 1999 World Cup by taking 17 wickets in their ICC Trophy campaign.

References

1958 births
Living people
Scottish cricketers
Tasmania cricketers
Hertfordshire cricketers
Australian cricketers
Australian emigrants to Scotland
Cricketers from Hobart